Polygala vayredae is a species of flowering plant in the milkwort family (Polygalaceae). It is endemic to the Pyrenees in Spain.

References

vayredae